Clarence Cummings Jr. (also known as CJ Cummings) (born 6 June 2000) is an American weightlifter, Pan American Champion and four time Junior World Champion, competing in the 69 kg category until 2018 and 73 kg starting in 2018 after the International Weightlifting Federation reorganized the categories.

Career
In 2018 he competed at the 2018 World Weightlifting Championships in the 73 kg category setting 4 Junior World Records. Cummings, at the IWF Junior World Weightlifting Championships, won the gold medal 2016–2018 in the -69kg weight category. At Suva in 2019, Cummings again won gold in a higher weight category, -73kg.

He competed in the men's 73 kg event at the 2020 Summer Olympics in Tokyo, Japan.

Major results

References

External links 
 

2000 births
Living people
Sportspeople from Beaufort, South Carolina
American male weightlifters
Pan American Weightlifting Championships medalists
Weightlifters at the 2020 Summer Olympics
Olympic weightlifters of the United States
21st-century American people